Nadia Hațegan (born 13 August 1979 in Mediaş, Romania) is a retired  Romanian artistic gymnast. She was a double world champion with the team (1994 and 1995) and a three time gold medalist at  European Championships (1992, 1993, and 1994).

References

External links
 

1979 births
Living people
Romanian female artistic gymnasts
Medalists at the World Artistic Gymnastics Championships
European champions in gymnastics
20th-century Romanian women